Clube Desportivo Recreativo do Seles is an Angolan sports club from the village of Seles, in the southern province of Kwanza Sul.

The team currently plays in the Gira Angola. Because their home stadium (Campo da Mangueira) failed to meet standard requirements by the Angolan Football Federation, the team has been playing its home games at the Estádio Comandante Hoji Ya Henda, in the capital city, Sumbe.

Achievements
Angolan League: 0

Angolan Cup: 0

Angolan SuperCup: 0

Gira Angola: 0

League & Cup Positions

Manager history

Players

See also
Girabola

References

External links
 Girabola.com Profile

Football clubs in Angola
Sports clubs in Angola